is a railway station on the Hisatsu Line in Hitoyoshi, Kumamoto Prefecture, Japan, operated by Kyushu Railway Company (JR Kyushu). The station opened in 1909.

Lines
Okoba Station is served by the Hisatsu Line. The station is located in a zig zag and also a spiral.

Adjacent stations

Gallery

See also
 List of railway stations in Japan

External links

  

Railway stations in Japan opened in 1909
Railway stations in Kumamoto Prefecture